Apha subdives is a moth in the family Eupterotidae. It was described by Francis Walker in 1855. It is found in Bangladesh, India, Bhutan, Myanmar, Thailand, Vietnam and China.

Subspecies
Apha subdives subdives
Apha subdives honei Mell, 1937
Apha subdives tychoona Butler, 1871
Apha subdives yunnanensis Mell, 1937

References

Moths described in 1855
Eupterotinae